Marie Heleen Lisette Kikkas (born 17 June 1996) is an Estonian footballer who plays as a midfielder for JK Tallinna Kalev and the Estonia women's national team.

Early life
Kikkas' mother, Kadri Kimsen, and her aunt, Kaire Kimsen, also played for the Estonia women's football team and were the first pair of sisters to do so. Kadri Kimsen played in the first ever official match for Estonia, against Lithuania. Marie Kikkas started playing football at the age of eight. In addition to football, she danced and performed gymnastics. At the age of 15, she committed to football and played in a boys' team.

Career
Kikkas played in Sweden for DFK Värmbol in 2016 and stayed there for one season. She made her debut for the Estonia national team on 1 December 2020 against Slovenia, coming on as a substitute for Kristina Bannikova.

References

External links

1996 births
Living people
Women's association football midfielders
Estonian women's footballers
Estonia women's international footballers
FC Flora (women) players
Footballers from Tallinn